Alessio di Mauro was the defending champion, but he lost in the first round against Mikhail Kukushkin in the first round.
Frederico Gil won in the final 6–1, 7–5 against Máximo González.

Seeds

Draw

Finals

Top half

Bottom half

References
Main Draw
Qualifying Draw

Aspria Tennis Cup - Singles
Aspria Tennis Cup